Trebova Planina is a mountain  in Zelengora mountain range in the Sutjeska National Park in the municipality of Foča, Republika Srpska, Bosnia and Herzegovina.

See also
List of mountains in Bosnia and Herzegovina

References

Mountains of Republika Srpska